Events from the year 1617 in France.

Incumbents 
Monarch: Louis XIII

Events
 
 
 
 
 
 

 April 24 – Encouraged by Charles d'Albert, the seventeen-year-old Louis XIII, king of France, forces his mother Marie de Medici, who has held de facto power, into retirement and has her favourite, Concino Concini, assassinated.
November 14 – L’Union de la Boîte was founded.

Births
 

 
 November 19 – Eustache Le Sueur, French painter (d. 1655)

Deaths

See also

References

1610s in France